Paul Feig (born September 17, 1962) is an American actor, comedian and filmmaker. He is known for directing films starring frequent collaborator Melissa McCarthy, including Bridesmaids (2011), The Heat (2013), Spy (2015), and Ghostbusters (2016). He also directed the black comedy mystery film A Simple Favor (2018) and the romantic comedy film Last Christmas (2019).

Feig created the comedy series Freaks and Geeks (1999–2000) and Other Space (2015). He has also directed several episodes of the U.S version of The Office, Arrested Development, Weeds and Nurse Jackie, as well as episodes of Mad Men, 30 Rock, and Parks and Recreation. He received nominations for two Primetime Emmy Awards for writing on Freaks and Geeks and two for producing and directing on The Office.

As an actor, Feig is best known for playing Tim the Camp Counselor in the comedy film Heavyweights (1995). He also appeared as Bobby Wynn in the sitcom The Jackie Thomas Show (1992–93) and as Mr. Eugene Pool on the sitcom Sabrina, the Teenage Witch (1996–97).

Early life
Feig was born and raised in Mount Clemens, Michigan. His mother, Elaine Elizabeth (née Artingstall), was a telephone operator, and his father, Sanford William Feig, owned Ark Surplus on Gratiot Avenue. Feig's father was born Jewish and converted to Christian Science; Feig's parents met at a church social, and Feig was also raised in Christian Science.

Career

1986–2010: Early career, Freaks and Geeks and directorial debut
After a year at Wayne State University, Feig moved to Los Angeles and transferred to the University of Southern California. He also worked as a tour guide at Universal Studios Hollywood, embarked on a stand-up comedy act, and landed minor roles on various television shows. Feig also appeared in a number of films, such as Ski Patrol, and in a role alongside Ben Stiller in the 1995 film Heavyweights, in which he played camp counselor Tim. On the first season of Sabrina, the Teenage Witch, Feig portrayed Mr. Eugene Pool, Sabrina's science teacher.

With Heavyweights co-scripter Judd Apatow, Feig created the short-lived comedy series Freaks and Geeks, inspired by his experiences at Chippewa Valley High School in Clinton Township, Michigan. The show aired on NBC during the 1999–2000 television season. Eighteen episodes were completed, but the series was canceled after only twelve had aired. Despite the short run, Freaks and Geeks has since maintained a devoted cult following. The show was named in Time magazine's 100 Greatest Shows of All Time, and in summer 2008, Entertainment Weekly ranked Freaks and Geeks as the 13th best show of the past 25 years. Feig was nominated for two Emmys for writing the show's pilot and the season finale.

Feig made his directorial debut with the drama film I Am David, which premiered at the 2003 Cannes Film Festival. He later directed the Christmas comedy film Unaccompanied Minors (2006).

2011–2016: Bridesmaids and other film works with Melissa McCarthy 
In 2011, Feig was consulted to direct the Apatow-produced comedy film Bridesmaids. Written by Annie Mumolo and Kristen Wiig, the plot centers on Annie (Wiig), who suffers a series of misfortunes after being asked to serve as maid of honor for her best friend, Lillian, played by Maya Rudolph. Budgeted at $32.5 million, Bridesmaids was both critically and commercially successful, eventually grossing over $288 million worldwide, and served as a touchstone for discussion about women in comedy. The film was nominated for a Golden Globe Award for Best Motion Picture – Musical or Comedy and received multiple other accolades, including Academy Award nominations in the Best Supporting Actress for Melissa McCarthy and Best Original Screenplay for Wiig and Mumolo.

In 2013, Feig reunited with McCarthy on buddy cop action comedy film The Heat, also starring Sandra Bullock. Directed by Feig and written by Katie Dippold, it centers on a mismatched police pairing who must overcome their differences in order to take down a mobster. The film received generally positive reviews from critics, who praised the chemistry, and performances of Bullock and McCarthy, and was a success at the box office, grossing $229 million worldwide against a $43 million budget.

In 2015, Feig wrote, directed, and produced the spy comedy movie Spy for 20th Century Fox, again starring Melissa McCarthy. It follows the life of a secret agent, Susan Cooper, trying to expose the black-market. The film received acclaim from critics and became another box office success at an international gross of $235.7 million. It was nominated for two Golden Globe Awards: Best Motion Picture – Musical or Comedy and Best Actress in a Motion Picture – Musical or Comedy for McCarthy. Also in 2015, Feig produced the animated feature The Peanuts Movie for Blue Sky Studios, based on the Peanuts comic strip and characters created by Charles M. Schulz. That same year, it was announced that Feig will direct a film adaptation of Play-Dohs for Hasbro Studios, 20th Century Fox, and Chernin Entertainment.

During 2015, Feig also created the science fiction comedy series Other Space for Yahoo!'s video on demand service Yahoo! Screen and wrote the show's first episode. The series stars Trace Beaulieu, Neil Casey, Eugene Cordero, Joel Hodgson, Conor Leslie, Bess Rous, Karan Soni, and Milana Vayntrub as the dysfunctional crew of an exploratory spaceship who become trapped in an unknown universe. Other Space received positive reviews, but was not renewed for a second season due to Yahoo! Screen being shut down in 2016. Feig later created a Tumblr to provide direct links to each episode after he reobtained the rights to the series. In 2020, the series was picked up by streaming service DUST.

In 2016, Feig directed and co-wrote the female driven reboot of the Ghostbusters franchise, starring McCarthy, Kristen Wiig, Kate McKinnon, and Leslie Jones as four women who begin a ghost-catching business in New York City.  The announcement of the female-led cast in 2015 drew a polarized response from the public and internet backlash, leading to the film's IMDb page and associated YouTube videos receiving low ratings prior to the film's release. The film grossed $229 million worldwide against a production budget of $144 million, becoming the highest-grossing live-action comedy domestically of 2016. However, due to its high production and marketing budget, it is considered a box-office bomb.

2017–present: A Simple Favor and Last Christmas
In 2017, Feig produced Jonathan Levine's comedy film Snatched, starring Amy Schumer and Goldie Hawn as a mother-daughter couple who are abducted while on vacation in South America. The same year, he began production on the comedy thriller A Simple Favor. Based on the 2017 novel of the same name by Darcey Bell, it stars Anna Kendrick, Blake Lively, and Henry Golding, and follows a small town blogger who tries to solve the disappearance of her mysterious and rich best friend. Released in September 2018, the film received generally favorable reviews from critics, with praise for the plot twists and performances of Kendrick and Lively.

In 2018, Feig directed an advertisement for Diet Coke starring Hayley Magnus, which was shown during the Super Bowl. In 2019, he directed the romantic comedy Last Christmas, reteaming with Henry Golding, who starred in the film alongside Emilia Clarke. The film received mixed reviews and was a box office success, earning over $120 million.

In March 2019, following 20th Century Fox's acquisition by The Walt Disney Company, Feig announced he would be moving his Feigco production studio to Universal Pictures.

Filmography

Film

Acting roles

Television

Acting roles

Bibliography
 Kick Me: Adventures in Adolescence (2002)
 Superstud: Or How I Became a 24-Year-Old Virgin (2005)
 Ignatius MacFarland: Frequenaut! (2008)
 Ignatius MacFarland: Frequency Freakout! (2010)

Awards and nominations

References

External links
 
 

1962 births
21st-century American comedians
21st-century American male writers
21st-century American screenwriters
American male film actors
American male screenwriters
American male television actors
American male television writers
American people of Jewish descent
American stand-up comedians
American television directors
American television writers
Comedians from Michigan
Comedy film directors
Directors Guild of America Award winners
English-language film directors
Film directors from Michigan
Living people
Male actors from Michigan
People from Mount Clemens, Michigan
People from Royal Oak, Michigan
Screenwriters from Michigan
Shorty Award winners
Television producers from Michigan
University of Southern California alumni
Wayne State University alumni